Pei Huailiang (born May 1941) is a general in the People's Liberation Army of China who served as president of the PLA National Defence University from 2003 to 2006. 

He was a delegate to the 7th and 8th National People's Congress, and a member of the Standing Committee of the 11th National People's Congress. He was an alternate member of the 14th, 15th, and 16th Central Committee of the Chinese Communist Party.

Biography
Pei was born in Xinjiang County, Shanxi, in May 1941, and graduated from Shanxi Water Conservancy College. 

He enlisted in the People's Liberation Army (PLA) and joined the Chinese Communist Party (CCP) in July 1961. He was assigned to the 21st Group Army in 1978. He was named chief of staff in 1983. He moved up the ranks to become deputy commander in August 1985 and commander in December 1986. He was deputy chief of staff of the Nanjing Military Region in 1990 and deputy commander of the Jinan Military Region in December 1993. He became president of the PLA National Defence University in January 2003, and served until August 2006. In March 2008, he took office as a member of the National People's Congress Foreign Affairs Committee.

He was promoted to the rank of major general (shaojiang) in September 1988, lieutenant general (zhongjiang) in July 1995, and general (shangjiang) in June 2006.

References

1941 births
Living people
People from Xinjiang County
People's Liberation Army generals from Shanxi
People's Republic of China politicians from Shanxi
Chinese Communist Party politicians from Shanxi
Delegates to the 7th National People's Congress
Delegates to the 8th National People's Congress
Members of the Standing Committee of the 11th National People's Congress
Alternate members of the 14th Central Committee of the Chinese Communist Party
Alternate members of the 15th Central Committee of the Chinese Communist Party
Alternate members of the 16th Central Committee of the Chinese Communist Party